Les p'tites Michu (The Little Michus) is an opérette in three acts, with music by André Messager and words by Albert Vanloo and Georges Duval. The piece is set in Paris in the years following the French Revolution and depicts the complications ensuing after the identities of two girls become confused in their infancy.

The opera opened at the Théâtre des Bouffes-Parisiens, Paris, on 16 November 1897 and ran for more than 150 performances. It became an international success, with productions in four continents, including an unusually long run of 400 performances in London, and had subsequent revivals in Paris.

Background and first production

After a considerable success in 1890 with his opéra comique La Basoche Messager had a series of failures later in the decade. Among these, Madame Chrysanthème (1893) played for 16 performances in Paris, Mirette (1894), written for London, had a disappointing run, and Le chevalier d'Harmental (1896) ran for only six performances at the Opéra-Comique. An opérette, La fiancée en loterie (1896), managed 71 showings, and a "pièce fantastique", La montagne enchantée (1897), closed after 35 performances. Discouraged by these failures, Messager resolved  to compose no more, and retreated to a cottage in the English countryside with his wife, the Irish songwriter Hope Temple. In 1897 he received an unsolicited libretto. He did not know at the time that three other composers had already turned it down, and it appealed to him greatly. He began composing and completed the score in three months.

The first performance was at the Théâtre des Bouffes-Parisiens on 16 November 1897, starring Odette Dulac in one of the title roles, with the production running for over 150 performances.

Roles

Synopsis
In 1793, the wife of the Marquis des Ifs dies in childbirth. The Marquis, before disappearing to evade arrest by revolutionary forces, entrusts the infant girl to the Michus, paying the family a sum of money that allows them to open a prosperous shop. The Michus have a daughter of their own. While bathing the two babies, M. Michu mixes them up and cannot tell which is which.

Act 1

By 1810, the girls, Blanche-Marie and Marie-Blanche, have grown up together, believing themselves to be twins, and have gone to school under the military Mlle. Herpin. Aristide, the Michus' clerk, is in love with one of the girls but is not sure which. The Marquis des Ifs, now a general, sends Bagnolet to find his daughter, whose hand he has promised to lieutenant Gaston Rigaud, an officer who saved his life. It turns out that Gaston is Mlle. Herpin's nephew, and while visiting his aunt, the girls meet the handsome lieutenant, and both are enchanted. Bagnolet finds the Michus. They are embarrassed at being unable to say which of the girls is the general's daughter.

Act 2
The general and his guests await the arrival of his daughter. When the Michus arrive, the general is impatient with their explanation: he wants to know which girl is his daughter and will marry the lieutenant. Knowing that her sister is enamoured of Gaston, Blanche-Marie decides to make a sacrifice and identifies her sister as the general's daughter.

Act 3

With a sad heart, Blanche-Marie resigns herself to marry Aristide, whom she finds exceedingly uninteresting. On the other hand, and to the astonishment of her fiancé and the Marquis, Marie-Blanche goes to help at the shop at every opportunity. She realizes that she has made a mistake: her sister loves Gaston, and she herself would prefer the common life of the shop and marriage to Aristide. The day of the double wedding, Marie-Blanche looks for a portrait of the Marquis' wife. Her idea is to dress Blanche-Marie as the late Marchionesse. The resemblance is astonishing. The Marquis believes that he sees his wife: Blanche-Marie must be his daughter.

The two couples are sorted out and all ends happily. Madame Michu forbids her husband to hand the two young women to their respective bridgrooms: "Don't you touch them, or you'll mix them up again!" 
Source: Gänzl and Lamb

Musical numbers 

Act 1
Overture
Chorus and couplets "Le tambour résonne" ("The drum resounds") – Pensionnaires
Duet "Blanche-Marie et Marie-Blanche" ("Blanche-Marie and Marie-Blanche") – The two sisters
Madrigal "Quoi, vous tremblez ma belle enfant" ("What, you tremble my beautiful child") – Gaston
Trio "Michu! Michu! Michu!" – Blanche-Marie, Marie-Blanche, Gaston
Couplets "Sapristi! le beau militaire" ("Sapristi! The handsome soldier") – Marie-Blanche
Trio "Nous v'là! Nous v'là!" et couplets "A l'ouvrage le matin" ("We're here! We're here!" and couplets "At work in the morning") – Mme Michu, Michu, Aristide
Ensemble "Voici papa, maman Gâteau" ("Look, father and mother: cake!") – Blanche-Marie et Marie-Blanche
Couplets "Blanche Marie, si douce" ("Blanche Marie, so sweet") – Aristide
Finale "Je viens d'entendre un roulement" ("I have just heard a drumroll") – All

Act 2
Introduction and chorus "A la santé du général" ("To the General's health!")
Rondo "Non, je n'ai jamais vu ça" ("No, I never saw that") – The General
Quartet "Entre là" ("Between them") – Blanche-Marie, Marie-Blanche, the Michus
Duet "Ah! Quel malheur, quel malheur" ("Ah what a disaster") – Blanche-Marie, Marie-Blanche"
Couplets "Me prenez-vous pour un conscrit" ("Do you take me for a conscript?") – The General
Prayer "St-Nicolas" – Blanche-Marie, Marie-Blanche
Trio "C'est la fille du général" ("It's the General's daughter") – Blanche-Marie, Marie-Blanche, Gaston
Finale: "Capitaine, approchez" et Couplets "Mesdames, grand merci" ("Captain, approach … Thank you very much, ladies") – Marie-Blanche

Act 3
Chorus and ensemble "A la boutique" ("At the shop")
Couplets "Comme une girouette mon coeur tourmait" ("My heart was turning like a weather-vane") – Aristide
Romance "Vois-tu, je m'en veux" ("See: I blame myself") – Blanche-Marie
Chorus "Bonjour, mesdam's les mariées" et ronde des Halles "On peux chercher en tous pays" ("Hello, ladies, brides" and Rondo of Les Halles "We can search in all lands") – Marie-Blanche
Duet "Rassurez-vous Monsieur Gaston" ("Do not worry, Monsieur Gaston") – Blanche-Marie, Gaston
Sextet " Assieds-toi là" ("Sit here") – Blanche-Marie, Marie-Blanche, the Michus, Aristide, Gaston
Finale "Blanche-Marie et Marie-Blanche" – All

Revivals and adaptations
A revival at the Théâtre des Folies-Dramatiques in 1899 starred Mariette Sully and Jean Périer.

The work was given in German in Berlin in December 1898. The same adaptation was presented in Vienna in September 1899 at the Carltheater. The German version was also seen in Cologne. The opera was given in the original French in Brussels in January 1899. An Italian production opened at the Teatro Constanzi in Rome in January 1900. The work played in Lisbon in 1901 and Algiers in 1904.

The piece enjoyed a long run in London under the title The Little Michus. The English adaptation was by Henry Hamilton, with lyrics by Percy Greenbank, and was produced by George Edwardes at Daly's Theatre. The composer conducted the first night, on 29 April 1905, and the piece ran for 400 performances. It starred Adrienne Augarde and Mabel Green, with Robert Evett, Willie Edouin, Huntley Wright, Amy Augarde, Willie Warde, Ambrose Manning, Louis Bradfield. A role was added during the run for the dancer Adeline Genée. A piece of comic business introduced during the run involved a fictional animal called the Gazeka, which became a London fad.

The Australian premiere of The Little Michus was in June 1906 at Her Majesty's Theatre, Sydney. In the US the work had a Broadway run in 1907, with George Graves, Ruth Julian and Alice Judson in the leading roles. and was first given in New Zealand in 1908.

Recordings
A recording of the complete opera was made in May 2018 by the Compagnie Les Brigands, the Orchestre National des Pays de la Loire, and the Choeur d'Angers-Nantes Opéra, conducted by Pierre Dumoussaud. A DVD was issued in 2005 of a complete performance of the opera given at the Théâtre municipal de Clermont-Ferrand, in April of that year.

Notes, references and sources

Notes

References

Sources

External links
 The Play Pictorial, Vol. 6 No. 35, London, June 1905, pp. 29–56. Includes illustrations of the London production, the cast and sets. Two musical numbers are printed.Description online here.

Information about The Little Michus and other shows opening in London in 1905

Operas by André Messager
1897 operas
French-language operas
Opérettes
Operas